Hans Wilhelm Kristofer Agrell (born 13 October 1950) is a Swedish writer and historian within the area of peace and conflict studies. His authorship has mostly focussed on Swedish foreign, security and defence policy during the Cold War.

Biography

Agrell was born in Uppsala, Sweden, the son of Jan Agrell, a professor of pedagogics and psychology working in the area of military psychology, and Estrid (née Ehrenberg). He's the grandson of Sigurd Agrell.

He studied at Stockholm University and received his bachelor's degree in 1972 and he served in the Swedish Army School of Staff Work and Communications (Arméns stabs- och sambandsskola, StabSbS) from 1972 to 1973. Agrell was then sent to the Middle East following the Yom Kippur War as part of the Swedish 52 M Battalion in the United Nations Emergency Force. After that he served in the Air Staff from 1974 to 1976 and was first administrative officer in the Defence Staff from 1976 to 1978. He started working at the Research Policy Institute in 1978 and started postgraduate studies at Lund University the same year, where he received his Ph.D. in history in 1985, with a thesis about the Swedish military doctrine from 1945 to 1982. He became docent at Lund University in 1987 and since 2006 he is professor of intelligence analysis at Lund University.

He is a member of the Royal Swedish Academy of War Sciences since 1990. In 2002, he was awarded the Nils Holgersson Plaque.

Personal life
In 1977 he married librarian Camilla Frostell (born 1952), the daughter of agronomist Hilding Frostell and Gunnel (née Brunberg).

References

1950 births
Living people
People from Uppsala
20th-century Swedish historians
21st-century Swedish historians
Writers from Uppland
Stockholm University alumni
Lund University alumni
Academic staff of Lund University
Members of the Royal Swedish Academy of War Sciences
Swedish Air Force personnel